Martín Alberto Tetaz (born 20 December 1974) is an Argentine economist and politician, currently serving as a National Deputy since 2021.

Early life and career
Tetaz was born on 20 December 1974 in La Plata, son of a bookkeeper and a law professor. He grew up in General Madariaga. He studied law at the National University of La Plata, graduating in 2001. He would later teach courses at that same university. After attaining his degree, he moved to Gillingham, England, where he worked at a pizzeria. He also began a post-graduate degree on cognitive psychology, but dropped out before completing it.

Political career
Tetaz's political involvement began in Franja Morada, the Radical Civic Union (UCR)'s student wing. In July 2021, he announced his candidacy for National Deputy as part of the Juntos por el Cambio coalition, of which the UCR forms part. 

In the 2021 legislative election, Tetaz was the second candidate in the Juntos por el Cambio list in Buenos Aires, behind María Eugenia Vidal. With 47.09% of the vote, Juntos por el Cambio was the most voted alliance in the city, more than enough for Tetaz to make it past the D'Hondt cut and be elected. He was sworn in on 4 December 2021, and began his mandate on 10 December 2021.

References

External links

Profile on the official website of the Chamber of Deputies (in Spanish)

Living people
1974 births
Argentine economists
People from La Plata
Politicians from Buenos Aires
Radical Civic Union politicians
Members of the Argentine Chamber of Deputies elected in Buenos Aires
21st-century Argentine politicians
National University of La Plata alumni
Academic staff of the National University of La Plata